Jenny Greene (born October 9, 1978) is an Astrophysicist and Professor at Princeton University. She is notable for her work on supermassive black holes and the galaxies in which they reside.

Early life and education
In 2000, Greene received a B.S in astronomy and physics (summa cum laude) from Yale University. She then attended Harvard for her Ph.D in Astronomy, her thesis entitled The Growth of Black Holes: From Primordial Seeds to Local Demographics.

Career
After her post-doctoral fellowship at Princeton, she became an Assistant Professor of Astronomy at UT Austin for a year. Since 2011, she has been an Assistant Professor of Astrophysical Sciences at Princeton.

Her broad research interests include measurements of black hole masses, the connection between supermassive black holes and galaxies, stellar and gas kinematics of galactic nuclei, and diffuse light in galaxy clusters.

Greene serves on the Leadership Committee of the Prison Teaching Initiative at Princeton University.

Awards and honors
 2000: Phi Beta Kappa
 2000: Yale University, George Beckwith Prize in Astronomy
 2002-2003: Certificate of Distinction in Teaching
 2001–2003: NSF Graduate Student Research Fellowship
 2006–2009: Hubble Fellow
 2006–2010: Carnegie-Princeton Fellow
 2008: AAS, Annie Jump Cannon Award
 2009: Harvard University Astronomy Department, The Bok Prize
 2011: Alfred P. Sloan Fellowship

References

External links
 Prison Teaching Initiative
 Jenny Greene at Princeton University Department of Astrophysical Sciences

Harvard Graduate School of Arts and Sciences alumni
Women astrophysicists
1978 births
Princeton University faculty
Yale University alumni
Living people
American astrophysicists
Recipients of the Annie J. Cannon Award in Astronomy